Rune Dahl (born 28 February 1955 in Stavanger, Norway) is a retired Norwegian sport rower. He was born in Stavanger. He competed at the 1976 Summer Olympics in Montreal.

References

External links 
 

1955 births
Living people
Sportspeople from Stavanger
Norwegian male rowers
Olympic rowers of Norway
Rowers at the 1976 Summer Olympics